Frederica Chase Dodd (November 3, 1893 – January 21, 1972) was an American educator, social worker, and clubwoman, one of the founders of Delta Sigma Theta.

Early life and education 
Chase was born in Dallas, Texas, the daughter of Frederic K. Chase and Fannie L. Hall Chase. Her father was an attorney and politician who died shortly before her birth. Her mother was a teacher. She graduated from Dallas Colored School No. 2, in 1910, and attended Howard University. She and 21 other Howard women founded Delta Sigma Theta in 1913. She marched with her sorority in a 1913 women's suffrage parade in Washington, D.C. Later in life, she earned a master's in social work degree from Atlanta University.

Career 
Chase taught school in Dallas after college, until she married in 1920. She was active in the National Association of Colored Women and the YWCA, and president of the Priscilla Art Club. She co-founded the Dallas alumnae chapter of Delta Sigma Theta. When her husband became too ill to work, she became a social worker with the Dallas Welfare Bureau, and soon director of the Negro Community Welfare Agency. From 1936 to 1961, she was a counselor at Family Service of Dallas.

Personal life and legacy 
Chase married a physician, John Horace Dodd, in 1920, as his second wife. He died in 1946, after several years of illness. She inherited the estate of her sorority sister and close friend, Jessie McGuire Dent, in 1948. Frederica Chase Dodd died in 1972, aged 79 years, in Dallas. The Dallas alumnae chapter of Delta Sigma Theta offers a Frederica Chase Dodd Scholarship to local students, and opened the Frederica Chase Dodd Life Development Center in Dallas. In 1985, the sorority published a short biography of Dodd, titled Beauty and the Best, Frederica Chase Dodd : the story of a life of love and dedication.

References 

1893 births
1972 deaths
People from Dallas
American social workers
Delta Sigma Theta founders
Howard University alumni
Clark Atlanta University alumni